Kevin Davies (born 1977) is an English footballer.

Kevin Davies may also refer to:

 Kevin Davies (director) (born 1961), British film and video director
 Kevin Davies (Bahamian footballer) (born 1967), Bahamian football manager
 Kevin Davids (born Kevin Davies), British actor
 Kevin John Davies, Surveyor General of Queensland, Australia, from 1982 to 1990

See also
Kevin Davis (disambiguation)